The Longyan dialect, also known as Longyan Minnan or Liong11l11334, is a dialect of Hokkien spoken in the urban city area of Longyan (eastern Longyan) in the province of Fujian, China while Hakka is spoken in rural villages of Longyan (western part). The Longyan Min people had settled in the region from southern part of Fujian Province as early as the Tang dynasty period (618–907). Although Longyan Min has some Hakka influence to a limited extent by the peasant Hakka Chinese language due to close distance of rural village Hakka peasants of the region, Longyan Min is a close dialect of the Minnan language and has more number of tones than Hakka (eight as compared to six). The Longyan dialect has a high but limited intelligibility with Southern Min dialects such as Hokkien–Taiwanese. Today, Longyan Minnan is predominantly spoken in Longyan's urban district Xinluo District while Zhangzhou Minnan is spoken in Zhangping City excluding Chishui and Shuangyang towns where Longyan Minnan is spoken. Hakka on the other hand is spoken in the non-urban rest of the rural areas of Longyan prefecture: Changting County, Liancheng County, Shanghang County, Wuping County, and Yongding District.

Branner suggests that the Xinluo and Zhangping dialects should be grouped with the Datian dialect as a coastal Min group separate from both Southern Min and Eastern Min.
However, he argues that the dialect of Wan'an township, in the northern part of Xinluo district, is a coastal Min variety separate from all of these.

Phonology
The Longyan dialect has 14 initials, 65 rimes, and 8 tones.

Initials

Rimes

Tones

Tone sandhi
The Longyan dialect has extremely extensive tone sandhi rules: in an utterance, only the last syllable pronounced is not affected by the rules.

The two-syllable tonal sandhi rules are shown in the table below (the rows give the first syllable's original citation tone, while the columns give the citation tone of the second syllable):

References

Further reading 
 

Fujian
Southern Min
Hokkien-language dialects